Konstantin Aleksandrov (born 10 October 1969) is a Kyrgyzstani former wrestler who competed in the 1996 Summer Olympics.

References

External links
 

1969 births
Living people
Olympic wrestlers of Kyrgyzstan
Wrestlers at the 1996 Summer Olympics
Kyrgyzstani male sport wrestlers
Kyrgyzstani people of Russian descent